The Ganzavia GAK-22 Dino was an unusual light utility aircraft built in Hungary in the early 1990s. In configuration, it was a biplane with cantilever wings and a very pronounced negative stagger, making it almost a tandem wing design. The pilot and a single passenger sat side by side under an expansive bubble canopy, and it had a fixed tricycle undercarriage. The fuselage was of welded steel tube construction, and the wings of duralumin, with the whole aircraft skinned in fabric, other than the forward fuselage which had aluminium skin. A single prototype flew in 1993, but the project was abandoned by the mid-1990s, with the aircraft itself placed in the Transport Museum of Budapest (Közlekedési Múzeum).

Specifications

See also

References
 
 

GAK-22 Dino
1980s Hungarian civil utility aircraft
Biplanes with negative stagger
Single-engined tractor aircraft
Aircraft first flown in 1993